Norway is an unincorporated community in Coos County, Oregon, United States, located between Coquille and Myrtle Point on Oregon Route 42, near the Coquille River.

The locale got its name from Olaf Reed (1827-1906), who settled there in the 1870s. Olaf Reed was a Norwegian immigrant who started a  partnership with Oden Nelson. They operated vessels on the Coquille River between  Myrtle Point  and Bandon, Oregon. Reed was a former sea captain and like his brothers Edward and Hans, he also worked as a shipbuilder.

Reed and Nelson started a general store in 1873.  Norway's post office was established in 1876 and as of 2003, it had been moved a few miles from its first location. Norway post office closed in 2002; the community's mail is addressed to Myrtle Point. There was also a Norway station on the Southern Pacific Coos Bay Line.

In 1977, the whole community was put up for sale. At the time the two-acre townsite consisted of a store with living quarters upstairs, a café, a post office, a home, several old motel cabins and a defunct gas station.

In the early 1990s the population was single digits, under 10.

See also
Norway Airport
Steamboats of the Coquille River

References

External links
Historic image of the Fox covered bridge near Norway from Salem Public Library

Norwegian-American culture in Oregon
Unincorporated communities in Coos County, Oregon
1876 establishments in Oregon
Populated places established in 1876
Unincorporated communities in Oregon